Iran national amateur freestyle wrestling athletes represents Iran in regional, continental, and world tournaments and matches sanctioned by the United World Wrestling (UWW).

Olympics

World Championship

Asian Games

Asian Championships

See also

Iranian results in men's freestyle wrestling
Iranian Premier Wrestling League
List of Iran national Greco-Roman wrestling medalists

References
  Iran Amateur Wrestling Federation
  Pars Sport
 FILA Wrestling Database

Wrestling in Iran
Freestyle wrestling
Iran Freestyle Mens
W